William Anderson (January 19, 1865 – May 5, 1936) was an American professional baseball player who played in one game for the Louisville Colonels in 1889. In that game, he pitched a complete game, and surrendered nine earned runs in a loss to the Philadelphia Athletics. As a hitter in that game, he collect a base hit in three at bats for a .333 batting average. He was a brother-in-law to fellow Colonels player Scott Stratton. He died in 1936 at the age of 71, and is interred at Valley Cemetery in Taylorsville, Kentucky.

References

External links

Major League Baseball pitchers
Louisville Colonels players
Baseball players from Kentucky
1865 births
1936 deaths
19th-century baseball players
People from Taylorsville, Kentucky